Geelong Regional Football Association (previously Western Victoria Soccer Association) is the governing body of soccer in Geelong, Victoria, Australia. It is the sub-branch governing body from the Football Federation Victoria.

It organises the Representative teams of Geelong which consist of Junior Divisions from ages 12 to 16 that participate in Melbourne's junior leagues. The club also contains a representative side of Women's; both Senior and Reserve teams.

GRFA's representative sides compete in the Annual tournament of the Country Championships, a tournament consisting of cities from greater Victoria; discluding Melbourne, from ages 13 to 16.

GRFA clubs
Armstrong United fc
Barwon FC
Barwon Heads
Bellarine Sharks
Bell Park 
Breakwater Eagles 
Corio
Corio Bay
Corio Cloverdale
Drysdale SC
Elcho Park Cardinals
Geelong SC
Deakin University
Geelong Rangers
Golden Plaines FC
Kardinia International College
Leopold sc
Lara United
Lovely Banks FC
North Geelong Warriors
Surfcoast FC
Surfside Waves

Former Teams
Geelong Celtic FC
Geelong United FC
East Geelong FC
International Harvester FC
Industrial Service Engineers Pty Ltd FC
Bacchus Marsh SC   League Winners & Cup Winners  3 years in total played in WVSA
 Brintons SC

Current ranking

See also
Australian football (soccer) league system

External links
 Official Website
 Football Federation Victoria

Soccer governing bodies in Australia
Soccer in Victoria (Australia)
Sport in Geelong
Organisations based in Geelong